The Gold Coast Suns 2015 season was its fifth season in the Australian Football League (AFL).

Club summary
The 2015 AFL season will be the 119th season of the VFL/AFL competition since its inception in 1897; having entered the competition in 2011, it will be the 5th season contested by the Gold Coast Football Club. Metricon Stadium will once again act as Gold Coast's primary home ground, hosting all of the club's eleven home games, and all of which will be played on Saturday. The club will play , the Brisbane Lions, the Sydney Swans and West Coast Eagles twice during the regular season, and travel interstate nine times (three times to Melbourne and once each to Sydney, Canberra, Geelong, Launceston, Adelaide and Perth) in addition to also playing an away game against the Western Bulldogs in Cairns. After four consecutive meetings in Queensland, the Suns will play  in Melbourne for the first time.

Major sponsors HostPlus and Fiat will continue as the club's two major sponsors, while BLK will manufacture the club's on-and-off field apparel for the next five seasons starting in 2015.

Senior Personnel
Rodney Eade will served as the club's head coach for the season, having replaced Guy McKenna who was sacked on 1 October 2014, while Gary Ablett, Jr. will continue as the club's captain for the fifth consecutive season.

2015 player squad

Playing list changes
During the 2014 off-season, the Suns acquired the services of 's Nick Malceski via the free agency system, while they also received Mitch Hallahan from the Hawthorn Football Club during the trade period in October. Foundation player Nathan Bock and Tom Murphy both retired last season, while Karmichael Hunt left the club to link with the Queensland Reds in the Super Rugby competition. In addition, Jackson Allen, Jack Hutchins, Jeremy Taylor, Matthew Warnock and Leigh Osborne were all delisted during the off-season.

The following summarises all player changes between the conclusion of the 2014 season and the commencement of the 2015 season.

In

Out

Season summary

Pre-season matches
The club will play three practice matches as part of the 2015 NAB Challenge, and will be played under modified pre-season rules, including nine-point goals.

Premiership Season

Home and away season

Ladder

Awards, Records & Milestones

Awards

Records

Milestones
Round 1:
 Adam Saad – AFL debut
 Touk Miller – AFL debut
 Nick Malceski – first game for Gold Coast
Round 2: Jarrod Harbrow – 150th AFL game
Round 4: Charlie Dixon – 50th AFL game

Brownlow Medal

Results

Brownlow Medal tally

 italics denotes ineligible player

Tribunal cases

Notes
"Points" refers to carry-over points accrued following the sanction. For example, 154.69 points draw a one-match suspension, with 54.69 carry-over points (for every 100 points, a one-match suspension is given).

References

Gold Coast Suns Season, 2015
Gold Coast Suns seasons